Pahrump is an unincorporated town located at the southernmost tip of Nye County, Nevada, United States, about  west of Las Vegas. Pahrump lies adjacent to the Nevada–California border and the area had a population of 44,738 as of the 2020 census.

History
Pahrump was originally inhabited by the Southern Paiute. It was slowly inhabited by settlers in the late 19th century. They reportedly chose the name for Pahrump after the original Southern Paiute name Pah-Rimpi, or "Water Rock," so named because of the abundant artesian wells in the valley. On the ranches, alfalfa and cotton were grown, and livestock were raised.

Until the 1960s, Pahrump had no telephone service except a radio transmitter phone in a phone booth next to the small market, and there were no paved roads in or out of the Pahrump Valley. As Las Vegas grew, real estate speculation became somewhat more popular in the area. This led to the introduction of telephone service and the construction of a paved highway between Las Vegas and Pahrump during the late 1960s. Later, this road (NV 160) was extended from Pahrump northward to US 95, near Amargosa Valley. A second paved road (NV 372) was introduced that went from Pahrump to neighboring Shoshone, California, which provided a link to the Death Valley area, as well as a shorter route to those wishing to travel to Los Angeles or other areas in California. In the fifties and sixties, there was a two-room elementary school and the high school students went to Shoshone. In 1974, Pahrump's first high school, Pahrump Valley High School, was constructed.

Pahrump is an archetypal example of an exurb. Almost all significant agriculture has ended in the valley, and over the years the surface aquifers have been drained.

Las Vegas casino owner Ted Binion buried a large treasure of silver in a secret underground vault in Pahrump. In 1998, Binion died under suspicious circumstances, and one of the parties accused of murdering Binion was apprehended while digging up the vault in Pahrump. A book about the Binion murder trial (and Las Vegas poker) is Positively Fifth Street by James McManus.

On November 15, 2006, the Pahrump town board voted for an ordinance declaring English the official language of business, forbidding the display of foreign flags, and denying any benefits to illegal immigrants. A measure in the ordinance required an American flag to be displayed above any other flag, regardless of what organization, nation, or government it represented. The ordinance was repealed four months later because of bad publicity.

On November 4, 2017, Koenigsegg Automotive AB achieved the highest top speed of a production car ever, surpassing the Bugatti Veyron.

Geography and climate
By area, it is the largest CDP in the contiguous United States, although it ranks only eleventh nationally, since the largest ten are all in Alaska. The area lies in the Mojave Desert.

Summers in Pahrump are generally very hot and dry, with occasional pushes of monsoonal moisture beginning in early July. Being at a similar elevation to Las Vegas, daytime highs in summer average within a few degrees lower than that of Las Vegas. Record highs are similar between the two cities as well. Nighttime temperatures, however, are noticeably cooler. This is due to the lack of an urban heat island in Pahrump, allowing for intense radiative cooling after sundown. As a result, summer nights are pleasantly warm, bottoming out in the mid-60s or 70s °F (around 20 °C). Pahrump's location in a valley leads to large diurnal temperature ranges, typically  but occasionally . By late August and early September, the sweltering summer heat noticeably tempers down. September is the gateway to fall, which brings very pleasant weather. October highs are generally  and nighttime temperatures in the 50s °F (low teens °C). Due to its elevation, Pahrump is protected from the searing summer temperatures experienced in the nearby Death Valley.

Like other locations in the Mojave desert, winters are typically mild, with occasional pushes of cold air from the north. Daytime highs average from the mid-50s and 60s °F (10s °C), but low temperatures hover around freezing for most nights between December to February. Spring brings pleasantly warm temperatures and cool evenings. Like other locations in the Mojave desert, this is the windiest time of year. Snowfall is rare in Pahrump, but there is generally at least one snow day per year.

Demographics

As of the census of 2000, there were 24,631 people, 10,153 households, and 7,127 families residing in the census-designated place (CDP) of Pahrump. The population density was 82.7 people per square mile (31.9/km). There were 11,651 housing units at an average density of 39.1 per square mile (15.1/km). The racial makeup of the CDP was 96.1% White, 0.1% African American, 1.1% Native American, 1.4% Asian, 0.37% Pacific Islander, 2.27% from other races, and 2.6% from two or more races. Hispanic or Latino of any race were 12.9% of the population.

There were 10,153 households, out of which 14.2% had children under the age of 18 living with them, 58.2% were married couples living together, 7.5% had a female householder with no husband present, and 29.8% were non-families. 23.5% of all households were made up of individuals, and 10.5% had someone living alone who was 65 years of age or older. The average household size was 2.42 and the average family size was 2.83.

In the CDP, the population was spread out, with 22.3% under the age of 18, 4.9% from 18 to 24, 10.6% from 25 to 44, 28.9% from 45 to 64, and 55.3% who were 65 years of age or older. The median age was 45 years. For every 100 females, there were 102.4 males. For every 100 females age 18 and over, there were 101.4 males.

The median income for a household in the CDP was $34,860, and the median income for a family was $39,812. Males had a median income of $35,862 versus $21,586 for females. The per capita income for the CDP was $17,708. About 7.3% of families and 10.7% of the population were below the poverty line, including 14.8% of those under age 18 and 7.0% of those age 65 or over. Nye County receives an unusually large 29 percent of its income from federal benefits which amounts to $9,408 for each resident of the county.

Government

Like many communities in Nevada, Pahrump has an unincorporated town status, with a limited government that manages land-use planning, recreation, and fire, while leaving most services to Nye County. In 2012 the citizens of Pahrump voted to disband the Town Board form of government due to the board's continued pushes for incorporation in favor of becoming an advisory board under the County Commissioners. It was finalized in 2014 when the incumbent elected members' terms expired. Per the Town of Pahrump website, the elected Pahrump Town Board was disbanded as of January 5, 2015.

Gregory Hafen II (R) represents the 36th district for the Nevada Assembly.

Education
Public education in Pahrump is administered by the Nye County School District.

Pahrump has a public library.

Economy
Notable businesses in the area include Front Sight Firearms Training Institute and the Spring Mountain Motor Sports Ranch. In addition, there are wineries, including Sanders Family Winery and Pahrump Valley Winery. Golden Entertainment operates three casinos in Pahrump.

Two legal brothels, Sheri's Ranch and Chicken Ranch, are located in Pahrump.  Due to their proximity to Las Vegas, they tend to be more expensive than other legal brothels in Nevada.

Media
Pahrump is serviced by Prime-TV affiliate KPVM-TV 25 It has 10 digital channels 25.1 (PrimeTV), 25.2 (thisTV, 25.3 America's Voice, 25.4 OANN, 25.5 Shop LC, 25.6 Home Shopping Network, 25.7 conservative talk radio, 25.8 country, 25.9 Nuestra Vision, and 25.10 Fun Roads. Pahrump is also home to KACP 103.1 FM which airs a country music format.

Transportation
Pahrump Valley Transportation is the only public transportation in Pahrump. However, there is also VetRANS, a transportation service for veterans. Both services run by appointment, and offer transport to certain destinations in Las Vegas. Salt Lake Express serves Pahrump on its bus route from Las Vegas to Reno. Eastern Sierra Transit Authority provides bus service from Pahrump to Tecopa, California.

Residents, and those visiting Pahrump, utilize McCarran International Airport in the Las Vegas area, approximately 60 miles east of Pahrump. A private airport, Calvada Meadows Airport, also serves Pahrump, however, aircraft must request permission before landing at this small airport. Enterprise Rent-A-Car operates a local branch for vehicle rental needs. Pahrump has taxi service operating 24 hours a day.

Notable residents
Pahrump was the hometown of author and radio personality Art Bell. He was known for founding Coast to Coast AM, an overnight radio talk show mainly about paranormal subjects, conspiracies and other oddities, a program that he broadcast from his home studio. At one time, Bell owned KNYE, the local radio station located in Pahrump. After the death of his wife Ramona, Bell remarried and relocated to the Philippines. On the December 28, 2006, broadcast of Coast to Coast AM, Bell announced he had returned to Pahrump, but he later returned to the Philippines, where he resided until 2011, when he again returned to Pahrump. Bell hosted Art Bell's Dark Matter, also dealing with paranormal subject matter, which aired on SiriusXM, from his home in Pahrump. In July 2015, Art Bell returned to the airwaves with a new show, Midnight in the Desert, which aired weeknights in a three-hour time slot. The show covered much of the same material as Coast to Coast AM. Bell retired from the show in December 2015. Bell died on April 13, 2018, in Pahrump.

Michael Jackson purchased a home in the area in 2008, where he briefly had a home studio and home schooled his three children.

Pahrump is the home of the third co-founder of Apple Computer, Ronald Wayne. Wayne relinquished his equity in Apple for $800 in 1976; he now lives a quiet lifestyle in Pahrump, selling stamps and rare coins.

The popular post-hardcore band Escape the Fate was founded in and originally from Pahrump, before the band relocated to Las Vegas.

Infamous "Hollywood madam" Heidi Fleiss moved to Pahrump in 2005.

Melvin Dummar, who claimed to have saved the life of Howard Hughes and who was named in a disputed will as Hughes' main beneficiary, lived for a while in Pahrump and died there in 2018.

Although brothel owner Dennis Hof died in nearby Crystal, he referred to himself in political ads as "The Trump of Pahrump", a sobriquet he credited to Donald Trump advisor Roger Stone (an early supporter of Hof).

Hof was elected posthumously to a seat in the Nevada Assembly in 2018. A group of county commissioners within the legislative district was empowered to appoint a successor; Pahrump utility general manager Gregory Hafen II won appointment to the seat.

Libertarian writer and filmmaker J. Neil Schulman, author of Alongside Night (1978) and writer/producer/director of the indie film Alongside Night, lived in Pahrump. Schulman was the first to produce a film that featured Pahrump, in the script of Lady Magdalene's, which starred Nichelle Nichols as the owner of the title brothel.

In popular culture
In the film Mars Attacks!, Martians land in Pahrump and announce they have "come in peace", but soon kill most of the humans gathered there.
Pahrump was featured in Studio 60 on the Sunset Strip in a two-part episode titled "Nevada Day". Part One aired November 6, 2006, and Part Two aired a week later on November 13. The scenes, however, were set only in the town jail and a small diner across the street, and the town itself was not featured, implying that Pahrump is much smaller than it actually is. 
The TV series Get Shorty is partly set in Pahrump. The city is the home town of main character Miles Daly, played by Chris O'Dowd.
The TV series Small Town News: KPVM Pahrump is about the only TV station in Pahrump.
Pahrump was featured in seasons 2, 3, and 4 of the TV series Live PD produced by A&E (TV network).

See also

 Carpenter Canyon Road leads from Pahrump to Carpenter Canyon and Carpenter Canyon Creek

References

External links

Town website
Tourism website

 
Census-designated places in Nevada
Micropolitan areas of Nevada
Census-designated places in Nye County, Nevada
Unincorporated towns in Nevada